Soundtrack is the first and only studio album by Australian recording jazz quartet Wizards of Oz.

At the ARIA Music Awards of 1989, the album won ARIA Award for Best Jazz Album.

Track listing

Release history

References

1988 albums
ARIA Award-winning albums
Wizards of Oz albums
Jazz albums by Australian artists